The men's 10,000 metres event at the 1992 World Junior Championships in Athletics was held in Seoul, Korea, at Olympic Stadium on 18 September.  Josephat Machuka finished second, but as he was being passed just before the finish, he deliberately punched at the eventual winner Haile Gebrselassie during the final sprint and was disqualified.

Medalists

Results

Final
18 September

Participation
According to an unofficial count, 23 athletes from 14 countries participated in the event.

References

10,000 metres
Long distance running at the World Athletics U20 Championships